Declan Pilkington (born 1969 in Birr, County Offaly) is an Irish sportsperson. He plays hurling with his local club Birr and was a member of the Offaly senior inter-county team between 1988 and 1996. Pilkington won All-Ireland minor medals in 1986 and 1987 an All-Ireland senior medal in 1994.

References

1969 births
Living people
Birr hurlers
Offaly inter-county hurlers
All-Ireland Senior Hurling Championship winners